William Allen Montgomery (1829–1905) was an American lawyer, planter and Baptist minister. Trained as a lawyer in Tennessee, he was a cotton planter in Texas in the 1850s and served as a Confederate chaplain in the American Civil War. He served as the President of Carson–Newman University from 1888 to 1892.

Early life
William Allen Montgomery was born on November 16, 1829 in Jefferson County, Tennessee. His father was William H. Montgomery and his mother, Sarah Jarnagin. His paternal grandfather, William Montgomery, was of English descent while his paternal grandmother was of Irish descent. His maternal grandfather, Chesley Jarnagin, was of Welsh descent while his maternal grandmother, the daughter of Baptist minister Isaac Barton, was of Huguenot and Dutch descent.

Montgomery was baptized in 1843. He went to the University of Tennessee in 1845, graduating in 1850. After serving as a legal aide to E. Alexander, a judge on the Knoxville Circuit Court, Montgomery was admitted to the bar in 1851. Later, Montgomery received a Doctor in Divinity from Carson–Newman University in 1870, and a Legum Doctor from the University of Tennessee in 1876.

Career
Montgomery became a cotton planter in Texas in 1855. In 1861, at the outset of the American Civil War, Montgomery voted in favor of secession, representing Washington County, Texas. By 1962, he became a Baptist chaplain in the Confederate States Army. At the end of the war, he had lost his wealth, but he was able to return to his life as a planter by working on his father-in-law's plantations in Tennessee.

Montgomery was ordained as a Baptist minister in 1868. He was a Baptist minister in Leadvale and Dandridge from 1868 to 1872. He then served as minister in Lynchburg, Virginia from 1872 to 1878. Subsequently, he was a minister in Memphis, Tennessee, Chattanooga, Tennessee, Greensboro, Georgia, Thomaston, Georgia, Rogersville, Tennessee, Hot Springs, North Carolina, and Jefferson City, Tennessee. At the same time, Montgomery was an evangelist in West Tennessee and Mississippi. Over the course of his service, at least 1,000 people were baptized in the Baptist Church.

Montgomery served as corresponding secretary of the board of missions of the Tennessee Baptist Convention from 1877 to 1880. He subsequently served as the President of the Tennessee Baptist Convention in 1881.

Montgomery served as the President of Carson–Newman University from 1888 to 1892. During his tenure, he oversaw the unification of Carson College, an all-male college, with Newman College, a women's college, in 1889. Meanwhile, the Administration Building, where classes were taught, was completed in 1892. (The building burnt down in the 1910s.) At the same time, Montgomery was also Professor of Metaphysics and Theology.

Montgomery served as the pastor of the First Baptist Church in Decatur, Georgia from 1897 to 1903. At the same time, he served as the President of the Pastors' Conference in Atlanta, Georgia from 1897 to 1903.

Montgomery was associate editor of the Tennessee Baptist with Dr. J. R. Graves. He was subsequently associate editor of the Religious Herald with Drs Jeter and Dickinson. He was also a correspondent for the Baptist and Reflector, another Baptist publication.

Personal life
Montgomery married Catherine Smith Franklin, the daughter of Lawson D. Franklin, a large planter who became Tennessee's first millionaire. The wedding took place on May 9, 1854. They had four sons and three daughters.

Death
Montgomery died on December 16, 1905.

References

1829 births
1905 deaths
American people of Dutch descent
American people of English descent
American people of Irish descent
American people of Welsh descent
People from Jefferson County, Tennessee
People from Washington County, Texas
People from Decatur, Georgia
University of Tennessee alumni
American lawyers
American planters
Southern Baptist ministers
Confederate States Army chaplains
Carson–Newman University faculty
American magazine editors
Journalists from Texas
Baptists from Tennessee
19th-century American clergy
Military personnel from Texas